Maria Assunta Pallotta (20 August 1878 – 7 April 1905), born Assunta Maria Pallotta, was an Italian Roman Catholic nun who served as a member of the Franciscan Missionaries of Mary and also as part of the missions to China during the Boxer Rebellion.

Following the recognition of two miracles, Pope Pius XII celebrated her beatification on 7 November 1954.

Early life
Maria Assunta Pallotta was born on 20 August 1878 as Assunta Maria to Luigi Pallotta and Eufrasia Casali.  She was the first of five children and one of two female children. She was baptized on the following day, 21 August (in the names of Assunta Maria Liberata), and was confirmed at the age of two on 7 July 1880, receiving her Confirmation from the Bishop of Ascoli Piceno, Bartolomeo Ortolani.

She began her schooling in 1884, at the age of six, attending until the age of eight in 1886. While she learned to read and write, she did not receive a formal education. 

By the time she was eleven - in 1889 - her father had left for work purposes, leaving her as the sole breadwinner of the household. Pallotta was forced to help her mother manage the home and to raise her brothers. In testimonies for her beatification people recalled that she was animated when given the chance to teach others about religious issues but was for the most part a solemn child who maintained penitential practices that were far too advanced for a child of her age. She had a love of the rosary and kept one on her person at all times.

She was noticed to have felt profound happiness at the age of twelve when she was able to receive her First Communion.

Life as a nun 
In her late teens she realized she wanted to be a nun. Her parish priest made arrangements for her to join a religious congregation that was a branch of the Franciscan Order. She left for Rome in order to do this on 5 May 1898. As a postulant worked in the kitchens. 

She commenced her novitiate on 9 October 1898 and at her request was able to keep her baptismal name, although it was rearranged to Maria Assunta. She was sent to Grottaferrata for her novitiate and was assigned there to both the care of animals and the harvesting of olives. Pallotta was admitted for profession on 8 December 1900 in the Church of Saint Helena. She was moved to Florence and arrived there on 3 January 1902.  On 1 January 1904 She put a request to join the Franciscan missions in China to work in the leper colonies.

Pallotta was eager to offer herself to God for the conversion of infidels and was devoted to the Poor Souls in Purgatory; she recited 100 times each day the Eternal Rest and gained indulgences for the Poor Souls. Her lifelong motto was: "I will become a saint!" To her parents - in January 1904 - she wrote: "I ask the Lord for the grace to make known to the world, purity of intention, which consists in doing everything for the love of God, even the most ordinary actions". Pallotta made her final vows on 13 February 1904 and not long after learned she would be going to the missions in China. Before she departed she had a private audience with Pope Pius X and asked for his blessing; he encouraged Pallotta and gave her his blessing. 

She departed on 19 March 1904 from Naples and arrived on 18 June 1904 in Tong-Eul-Keou; her sole desire being to serve the poor. She worked for several months as a cook in an orphanage. It was in China that she learned to speak Mandarin.

On 19 March 1905 she learnt that she had contracted typhus and thus on 25 March 1905 - as her health took a steep decline - asked for the Holy Viaticum and the Extreme Unction as well as the sacraments. When one of her fellow religious sisters seemed about to die of the disease she asked to die instead. On 7 April 1905 she died with the mission's confessor and others around her when all of a sudden a delightful fragrance filled the room similar to violets and incense. Her final words, in Mandarin, were: "Eucharist! Eucharist!" Her remains remained in the infirmary, but Chinese Christians stormed the place demanding to experience the miracle for themselves as news of the odor spread. For three days the scent filled the house until her funeral and burial on 9 April 1905.

The superior of the congregation met with Pius X in a private audience and told him of the odor the late Pallotta emanated; the pontiff expressed a keen interest in her beatification and said: "You have to start the cause and soon!" Her remains were exhumed on 23 April 1913 and were found to be incorrupt but with her burial robes disintegrating. She is now buried in Tai Yan-Fou.

Beatification
The proceedings for the beatification process commenced on two fronts in two processes in both China, in the diocese where Pallotta died, as well as in Frascati near Rome. The decree on all of her writings - which were required for the cause and to investigate the depth of her spiritual life and adherence to church doctrine - was approved and signed on 23 January 1918.

These two processes and the validation of her writings took place despite the fact that the Congregation of Rites did not grant their formal approval to the cause until 25 July 1923, thus granting Pallotta the title Servant of God. The two processes were then ratified and validated on 13 November 1928 and allowed for Rome to investigate the cause themselves.

On 28 February 1932 she was proclaimed to be Venerable after Pope Pius XI acknowledged the fact that Pallotta had lived a model Christian life of heroic virtue which was deemed to be exercised to an extraordinary degree.

Two miracles required for the beatification to take place were investigated and received the papal approval of Pope Pius XII on 19 October 1954. The pope presided over her beatification on 7 November 1954.

The current postulator of the cause is the Franciscan friar Giovangiuseppe Califano.

Legacy 
In 2012 a school named after Pallotta, Blessed Maria Assunta Pallotta Middle School, was opened in Waterloo, Iowa.

References

External links
Hagiography Circle

1878 births
1905 deaths
19th-century venerated Christians
19th-century Italian Roman Catholic religious sisters and nuns
20th-century Italian Roman Catholic religious sisters and nuns
20th-century venerated Christians
Beatifications by Pope Pius XII
Roman Catholic missionaries in China
Deaths from typhus
Franciscan missionaries
Italian beatified people
People from L'Aquila
Italian Roman Catholic missionaries
Italian emigrants to China